Ad hoc On-Demand Distance Vector (AODV) Routing is a routing protocol for mobile ad hoc networks (MANETs) and other wireless ad hoc networks. It was jointly by Charles Perkins (Sun Microsystems) and Elizabeth Royer (now Elizabeth Belding) (University of California, Santa Barbara) and was first published in the ACM 2nd IEEE Workshop on Mobile Computing Systems and Applications in February 1999.

AODV is the routing protocol used in Zigbee – a low power, low data rate wireless ad hoc network. There are various implementations of AODV such as MAD-HOC, Kernel-AODV, AODV-UU, AODV-UCSB and AODV-UIUC.

The original publication of AODV won the SIGMOBILE Test of Time Award in 2018.  According to Google Scholar, this publication reached 30,000 citations at the end of 2022.  AODV was published in the Internet Engineering Task Force (IETF) as Experimental RFC 3561 in 2003.

See also
Wireless ad hoc networks
Backpressure routing
Mesh networking
Wireless mesh network § Routing protocols
List of ad hoc routing protocols

References

Ad hoc routing protocols